This is a list of Germans convicted of war crimes committed in Italy during World War II. War crimes in Italy were committed by both the Wehrmacht and the SS, which in turn was sub-divided into the combat forces of the Waffen-SS and the security and police forces of the Allgemeine-SS. Research in 2016 in the form of the Atlas of Nazi and Fascist Massacres in Italy, funded by the German government, found the number of victims of Nazi German and Fascist Italian war crimes to be 22,000. The victims were primarily Italian civilians, sometimes in retaliation to partisan attacks. Thousands of others were murdered because they were Jewish.

The perpetrators of most documented war crimes are unknown. Of those whose identities are known, only a small number were ever tried. After the war, both governments focused on improving Germany-Italy relations, rather than bringing war criminals to justice. This tendency was exacerbated by the prominence of former Nazis in the West German government and Italy's fears that its own citizens would be held accountable for crimes committed while Italy was part of the Axis. In addition, the Christian Democracy party in power in Italy after the war would not have benefitted politically from drawing attention to the Communist-dominated Italian resistance.

Recently, Italy has tried a number of German war criminals in absentia due to Germany's refusal to extradite them. These convicted criminals can avoid serving their prison sentences by remaining in Germany. Germany's refusal to extradite war criminals to Italy or prosecute them in German courts has ignited controversy. The response to Germany's refusal to extradite eight Germans convicted in absentia for the murder of 560 Italian civilians at Sant'Anna di Stazzema led to the German government's decision to fund research into war crimes committed by Axis forces in Italy.

Only a very small number of German military personnel were placed on trial in Italy in the first five years after the war, up to 1951. After 1951 only a handful of trials were conducted until 1996, when the case against Erich Priebke started a new wave of court cases. By then, in many cases, because decades elapsed between the crimes and their prosecution, the accused either had died already, died during the court case or were deemed too old to be extradited or serve time in jail. An example of those is the San Cesario sul Panaro massacre, where twelve civilians were killed and where three of the four officers accused died before the trial commenced in 2004 and the fourth one died on the second day of the trial, leaving the massacre without legal repercussions for the perpetrators.

List
This is a list of convicted German war criminals:

References

External links
 Atlas of Nazi and Fascist Massacres in Italy

The Holocaust in Italy
Kingdom of Italy (1861–1946)
Italian Social Republic